Cork Street runs from the junction of The Coombe to Donore Avenue.

History
It was named after the first Earl of Cork and once formed part of the ancient highway "An Slighe Dála" connecting Dublin with the west of Ireland. On old maps it was described as "The Highway to Dolfynesberne" (Dolphin's Barn).

The street was once a centre of fine wool and silk hand-loom weaving. The woollen industry was killed off around 1700 by the English government, who wanted to keep the wool monopoly in England, although a minor revival was started around 1775. Despite problems, silk spinning and the manufacture of poplin, supported by the Royal Dublin Society, continued into the 19th century.

The Tenter House was erected in 1815 in this street, financed by Thomas Pleasants. Before this the poor weavers of the Liberties had either to suspend work in rainy weather or use the alehouse fire and thus were (as Wright expresses it) "exposed to great distress, and not infrequently reduced either to the hospital or the gaol." The Tenter House was a brick building 275 feet long, 3 stories high, and with a central cupola. It had a form of central heating powered by four furnaces, and provided a place for weavers to stretch their material in bad weather.

In 1861 a Carmelite priest bought the Tenter House and opened it as a refuge for the homeless. He ran the hostel for ten years until 1871 when the Sisters of Mercy came to Cork Street. In 1873 they built a convent and in 1874 a primary school, which closed down in 1989.

The Cork Street Fever Hospital (also known as the House of Recovery) was a hospital that opened in Cork Street on 14 May 1804. The hospital was extended in 1817-1819 to help cope with a national typhus epidemic. In 1953 the Cherry Orchard Hospital in Ballyfermot replaced the old Cork Street hospital, which was renamed Brú Chaoimhín and became a nursing home.

Across the road from the hospital is the James Weir Home for nurses, built in 1903. The site had once been a Quaker burial ground.

In 1932 the Maryland housing development off Cork Street was constructed by Dublin Corporation. 1932 was a Marian year, hence the name Maryland.

During the mid 20th century, there were plans to widen the road into a dual carriageway, leading to buildings being left to fall into decay while the threat of compulsory purchase orders seemed possible. The street was totally reconstructed towards the end of the 20th century. It is now a mostly residential area.

References

Streets in Dublin (city)
History of Dublin (city)